The UCSF School of Medicine is the medical school of the University of California, San Francisco and is located at the base of Mount Sutro on the Parnassus Heights campus in San Francisco, California. Founded in 1864 by Hugh Toland, it is the oldest medical school in California and in the western United States. U.S. News & World Report ranked the school third in research training and second in primary care training; it is the only medical school in the nation to rank among the top three in both categories.  Six members of the UCSF faculty have received the Nobel Prize in Physiology or Medicine and five have received the National Medal of Science.

For fiscal year 2022, UCSF was the top recipient of National Institutes of Health (NIH) research funding and awards amongst all U.S. organizations, with $818.3 million in funding across 1,497 awards.  The school is affiliated with the UCSF Medical Center, which is ranked, in the 2022-23 U.S. News & World Report rankings, as the 12th best hospital in the United States and third best hospital in the state of California. UCSF faculty have treated patients and trained residents since 1873 at the San Francisco General Hospital and for over 50 years at the San Francisco VA Medical Center.

The UCSF School of Medicine has seven major sites throughout the San Francisco Bay Area and is composed of 28 academic departments, eight organized research units, and five interdisciplinary research centers. The main site is at the Parnassus Heights campus, which is home to the UCSF Medical Center and the Langley Porter Psychiatric Institute. The UCSF Medical Center at Mission Bay opened in 2015 and is home to the UCSF Benioff Children's Hospital, UCSF Betty Irene Moore Women's Hospital and the UCSF Bakar Cancer Hospital.

History
The school was founded in 1864 as the Toland Medical College by Hugh H. Toland, a South Carolina surgeon who found great success and wealth after moving to San Francisco in 1852. A previous school, the Cooper Medical College of the University of Pacific (founded 1858), entered a period of uncertainty in 1862 when its founder, Elias Samuel Cooper, died. In 1864, Toland founded Toland Medical College and the faculty of Cooper Medical College chose to suspend operations and join the new school. In 1873 the college affiliated with the University of California. Together with the School of Dentistry, they became UCSF's first two “Affiliated Colleges” and were followed by the College of Dentistry in 1881 and the UC Training School for Nurses in 1907.

The University of California was founded in 1868, and by 1870 Toland Medical School began negotiating an affiliation with the new public university. Meanwhile, some faculty of Toland Medical College elected to reopen the Medical Department of the University of the Pacific, which would later become Stanford University School of Medicine. Negotiations between Toland and UC were complicated by Toland's demand that the medical school continue to bear his name, an issue on which he finally conceded. In March 1873, the trustees of Toland Medical College transferred it to the Regents of the University of California, and the school became "The Medical Department of the University of California."

Initially, the three Affiliated Colleges were located at different sites around San Francisco, but near the end of the 19th Century interest in bringing them together grew. To make this possible, San Francisco Mayor Adolph Sutro donated 13 acres in Parnassus Heights at the base of Mount Parnassus (now known as Mount Sutro). The new site, overlooking Golden Gate Park, opened in the fall of 1898, with the construction of the new Affiliated Colleges buildings. The school's first female student, Lucy Wanzer, graduated in 1876, after having to appeal to the UC Board of Regents to gain admission in 1873.

The University gained more independence in the 1960s when it started to be seen as a campus in its own right instead of as the medical center of the UC system. The four departments were renamed as "School of ..." and the UCSF Graduate Division was founded in 1961. In 1964 the institution obtained full administrative independence under the name University of California, San Francisco Medical Center, becoming the ninth campus in the University of California system and the only one devoted exclusively to the health sciences.

A pivotal moment in UCSF history was the deal between Vice-Chancellor Bruce Spaulding and San Francisco Mayor Willie Brown for the development of the Mission Bay campus in 1999. Renowned scientist J. Michael Bishop, recipient of both the Lasker Award and Nobel Prize in Medicine (together with UCSF professor Harold Varmus), became the eighth Chancellor in 1998. He oversaw one of UCSF's major transition and growth periods, including the expanding Mission Bay development and philanthropic support recruitment. During his tenure, he unveiled the first comprehensive, campus-wide, strategic plan to promote diversity and foster a supportive work environment. During this time, UCSF also adopted a new mission: advancing health worldwide™. The 2010s saw increased construction and expansion at Mission Bay, with the Smith Cardiovascular Research Building, the UCSF Medical Center at Mission Bay, and the Benioff Children's Hospital in 2010, the Sandler Neuroscience Center in 2012, and Mission Hall and the Baker Cancer Hospital in 2013. In 2012, the school opened the UCSF Anatomy learning center. The Children's Hospital was named after Mark Benioff, who donated $100 million toward the new facility. In 2015, the Mission Bay campus saw the grand opening of the new UCSF Medical Center at Mission Bay, a 289-bed integrated hospital complex dedicated to serving children, women and cancer patients. The school started the new Bridges curriculum in 2016 with the class of 2020.

Faculty

The School of Medicine has 2,498 full-time faculty. There have been six Nobel Prize winners over the past six decades, and among its 2018 faculty members are:

 43 members of the National Academy of Sciences
 84 members of the National Academy of Medicine
 18 Howard Hughes Medical Institute investigators
 32 NIH Innovator and Young Innovator Awards
 64 members of the American Academy of Arts & Sciences

List of deans

 Hugh H. Toland (1864-1870) 
 R. Beverly Cole (1870-1875, 1878-1882) 
 Alonzo A. O'Neill (1875-1878) 
 Robert A. Maclean (1882-1899) 
 Arnold A. D'Ancona (1899-1913)
 Hebert C. Moffitt (1913-1919) 
 Wallace I. Terry (1919-1920) 
 David P. Barrows (1921-1923) 
 Lionel S. Schmitt, acting (1923-1927)
 R. Langley Porter (1927-1936, 1939-1940)
 W. McKim Marriott (1936) 
 Chauncey D. Leake (1937-1939)
 Robert Gordon Sproul (1940-1942) 
 Francis S. Smyth (1942-1954) 
 John B. Lagen (acting) (1954-1956)
 John B. De C. M. Saunders (1956-1963) 
 William O. Reinhardt (1963-1966) 
 Stuart C. Cullen (1966-1970) 
 Charles T. Carman (1970)
 Julius R. Krevans (1971-1982)
 Joseph B. Martin (1989-1993) 
 Haile Debas (1993-2003)
 David A. Kessler (2003-2007)
 Sam Hawgood, (2007-2014)
 Bruce Wintroub, Interim (2014-2015)
 Talmadge E. King Jr. (2015–present)

Bixby Center for Global Reproductive Health
The Bixby Center for Global Reproductive Health, founded in 1999, is a research center studying obstetrics, gynecology, and reproductive science at the University of California, San Francisco School of Medicine and the San Francisco General Hospital. Its focus includes research, clinical care, policy development, and training on issues affecting sexual health. This includes resources and advocacy to advance reproductive autonomy, including access to contraception and abortion services, and access to care during pregnancy and childbirth. 

The Center's founding director was Claire Brindis; as of 2021 it is led by Jody Steinauer.  It includes over 200 medical, research, and other staff across the university, and runs a series of residencies and clinical care programs. 

The Bixby Center's programs include research programs, fellowships and residencies, and training and clinical centers.

Research programs include Advancing New Standards in Reproductive Health, studying how policies and public discussion shape people's sexual and reproductive lives; Beyond the Pill, studying and promoting access to contraceptive health care for women; and PRONTO International and the Safe Motherhood Program, developing care strategies and training to optimize care during childbirth.

Obstetrics and gynecology residencies include a two-year fellowship in Family Planning, and the Kenneth J. Ryan residency program in the United States and Canada. Training and clinical centers include the California Prevention Training Center for HIV/AIDS and STD care and prevention, the New Generation Health Center for youth in San Francisco. Bixby has also supported international clinics, including the Family AIDS Care & Education Services in Kisumu County, Kenya, in partnership with the Kenya Medical Research Institute, and the Clinical Trials Research Center at the University of Zimbabwe, both researching treatment and prevention of HIV-related illness and women’s health.

A sister center on Population and Reproductive Health, was set up at UCLA.

References

External links

 
 Bixby Center for Global Reproductive Health
 Advancing New Standards in Reproductive Health (ANSIRH)
 Beyond the Pill
 PRONTO International
 Safe Motherhood Program
 California Prevention Training Center
 New Generation Health Center

University of California, San Francisco
Medical schools in California
Educational institutions established in 1864
1864 establishments in California
Research institutes